Egloshayle (pronounced "eglos-hale" –  meaning church and heyl meaning estuary) is a civil parish and village in north Cornwall, England, United Kingdom. The village is beside the River Camel, southeast of Wadebridge. The civil parish stretches southeast from the village and includes Washaway and Sladesbridge.

History
Egloshayle was a Bronze Age settlement and later a river port, rivalling Padstow  downriver. The trade consisted of tin, clay, wool, and vegetable crops. Egloshayle is now a residential suburb of Wadebridge.

Wadebridge developed in the parishes of Egloshayle and St Breock. A Vicar of Egloshayle named Thomas Lovibond was responsible for the construction of the first bridge across the River Camel to replace a dangerous ford. Begun in 1468 and completed in 1485, the bridge was traditionally known as the "Bridge on Wool" because it was reputedly built on wool sacks. In fact, however, it has been proven to be founded directly on the underlying bedrock.

Churches
The parish church, which is Grade I listed, is named after St Petroc and is constructed almost entirely in the Perpendicular style. It has a Norman font, a stone pulpit dating from the 15th century, and also has a fine monument to Dame Barbara Molesworth (ob. 1735). There is a peal of eight bells: the tenor bell weighs 12-1-25.

The Anglican chapel at Washaway, dating from 1883, has a font which is one of the earliest in the county. Arthur Langdon (1896) recorded that there were six stone crosses in the parish, including two in the parish churchyard and one at Washaway. (Another cross is described at Pencarrow.)

The bell-ringers of the village are celebrated in the song The Ringers of Egloshayle. The ringers named in the song are all buried in the churchyard of the village church and their names may be seen on the headstones. The song has been recorded by, amongst others, the well-known Cornish singer Brenda Wootton.

Notable buildings and antiquities
Local private properties of interest include Pencarrow House (18th century) and Croan House (17th century), each of which have seven bays.
Kelly Rounds (or Castle Killibury) is an Iron Age fort on the border of the parish and has been associated with the legend of King Arthur.

One of the houses on the Egloshayle road overlooking the River Camel is Grade 2 listed.

Notable people
Plant collecting brothers William and Thomas Lobb, spent their early life at Egloshayle.

Arthur Hamilton Norway (1859–1938), who became head of the Post Office in Ireland before the First World War, and the father of novelist Nevil Shute, was born in the village.

References

Further reading

 Maclean, John (1872–79) The Parochial and Family History of the Deanery of Trigg Minor. 3 vols. London: Nichols & Son

External links

Villages in Cornwall
Civil parishes in Cornwall